Sulfur oxoacids are chemical compounds that contain sulfur, oxygen, and hydrogen. The best known and most important industrially used is sulfuric acid. Sulfur has several oxoacids; however, some of these are known only from their salts (these are shown in italics in the table below). The acids that have been characterised contain a variety of structural features, for example:
tetrahedral sulfur when coordinated to oxygen
terminal and bridging oxygen atoms
terminal peroxo groups
terminal S=S
chains of (−S−)n

See also
Chlorosulfuric acid
Fluorosulfuric acid
Nitrosylsulfuric acid
Peroxydisulfuric acid
Sulfinic acids
Sulfonic acids

References

External links
 Sulfur oxoacids along with other acids containing sulfur

Sulfur compounds